Emmanuel Castis (born 1 February 1976), is a South African actor, singer and dancer of Greek descent. He is best known for his roles in the popular serials Isidingo, Erfsondes and Black Sails.

Personal life
He was born on 1 February 1976 in Johannesburg, South Africa to Greek parents, Mike Castis and Maro Castis. He graduated with a degree in dramatic arts at the University of Witwatersrand.

He is married to his longtime partner Sharlene Economou. They got engaged at Komati Gorge Lodge in Mpumalanga.

Career
He started acting in 1997 with theatre plays along with PJ Sabbagha and the Forgotten Angle Dance Theatre Company where he played the role 'Lennox' in popular play Macbeth. Then he involved in musical theater. Meanwhile, he made his television debut with popular television soapie Isidingo in 1999. In the serial, he played the role 'Steve Stethakis' which became highly popular. In 2004, he won the people's award for Best Actor in a television soapie. Then he appeared in the serial Erfsondes as the lead male protagonist. and nominated twice for South African Film and Television Awards (SAFTA) for Best Actor in a television series. In 2008, he won the celebrity reality competition of the South African version of Dancing with the Stars.

Apart from acting, he is also a prolific singer, where he recorded his first music album in 2008 with the title "South of Nowhere". In the same year, he won the Season 4 of the reality show Strictly Come Dancing. Then in 2011, he released the single "Stop Running" in 2011 and single "Alive" in the end of 2015.

In 2014 he was a judge for the SAFTAs. He also appeared in two popular international serials, Wild at Heart and Black Sails. In the meantime, he starred in several blockbuster films: Cryptid, Eternity and Tremors 5: Bloodlines. The, he toured around the world with the Broadway hit musical Jersey Boys, as one of the leads 'Nick Massi'. He later received positive critical acclaim and received a nomination for Best Actor in a musical at the Naledi Theatre Awards.

Filmography

References

External links
 

1976 births
Living people
People from Johannesburg
South African male film actors
South African male television actors
South African people of Greek descent
South African male stage actors